Earth's Fury (also known as Anatomy of Disaster outside the United States) is an American documentary television series that ran on The Learning Channel from February 24, 1997 to November 17, 1998.

Produced by GRB Entertainment, each episode examines   natural disasters and the science of the natural phenomena such as earthquakes, forest fires, tornadoes, hailstorms, hurricanes, typhoons, volcanic eruptions, floods and landslides.

All episodes of the series are narrated by voice actor Michael Bell.

Episodes

Series overview

Season 1 (1997)

Season 2 (1998)

Broadcast history

The show was first shown on The Learning Channel in the United States from February 24, 1997 until November 17, 1998.

Some episodes of the show was shown in reruns on The Weather Channel (via the Storm Week series of television specials about  weather phenomena, the Earthquake! episode was later shown as an episode of Storm Stories in 2006) in 2005 and the Fox Reality Channel in the United States from 2008 until 2009.

In Europe, the show was shown on Reality TV (now known as CBS Reality) from 2001 until 2005.

International versions
On August 22, 2010, a version of the show titled Anatomy of a Disaster that is hosted by actor Richard Gutierrez,  began airing on GMA Network, a Philippine television channel and lasted until November 6, 2011.

Streaming release
, the show is made available for streaming online on the free, advertiser-supported video-on-demand streaming services Pluto TV (Latin American version only), Vix (both dubbed in Spanish under the title Anatomia del Desastre) and Tubi.
On December 20, 2016, GRB Entertainment launched a channel dedicated to the show and posted the show's all thirteen episodes on YouTube, but the channel is currently geoblocked in some countries, including the United States.

References

External links
 
 
 

1990s American documentary television series
1997 American television series debuts
1998 American television series endings
TLC (TV network) original programming
Disaster television series
Television series by GRB Entertainment
English-language television shows
Documentary films about natural disasters